P. crocea may refer to:

 Palicourea crocea, a flowering plant
 Papillaria crocea, an Australian moss
 Parathelphusa crocea, a freshwater crab
 Peristernia crocea, a sea snail
 Phiale crocea, a jumping spider
 Pleurothallis crocea, a flowering plant
 Potentilla crocea, a flowering plant
 Pseudanarta crocea, a North American moth
 Pseudosciaena crocea, a croaker native to the western Pacific
 Pterocera crocea, a sea snail
 Pyrrocoma crocea, a perennial plant